Ildar Amirov (born 9 October 1987) is a Kyrgyzstani footballer of Tatar descent, last played as a striker.

Career
He played for Chennai City in the I-League. He is a member of the Kyrgyzstan national football team. He is the older brother of Ruslan.

Career statistics

International

Statistics accurate as of match played 7 June 2016

International goals
Scores and results list Kyrgyzstan's goal tally first.

References

External links

1987 births
Living people
Kyrgyzstani people of Tatar descent
Kyrgyzstani footballers
Kyrgyzstan international footballers
Kyrgyzstani expatriate footballers
FC Dordoi Bishkek players
Ildar Amirov
Footballers at the 2006 Asian Games
Footballers at the 2010 Asian Games
FC Alga Bishkek players
Expatriate footballers in India
Expatriate footballers in Thailand
Expatriate footballers in Turkey
Kyrgyzstani expatriate sportspeople in Turkey
Kyrgyzstani expatriate sportspeople in India
Kyrgyzstani expatriate sportspeople in Thailand
Association football forwards
Asian Games competitors for Kyrgyzstan
Tatar sportspeople